Hinduism is one of Sri Lanka's oldest religions, with temples dating back over 2,000 years. , Hindus made up 12.6% of the Sri Lankan population. They are almost exclusively Tamils, except for small immigrant communities from India and Pakistan (including the Sindhis, Telugus and Malayalees). 

According to the 1915 census, Hindus made up about 25% of the Sri Lankan population (including indentured labourers brought by the British). Hinduism predominates in the Northern and Eastern Provinces (where Tamils remain the largest demographic), the central regions and Colombo, the capital. According to the 2011 census, there are 2,554,606 Hindus in Sri Lanka (12.6% of the country's population). During the Sri Lankan Civil War, many Tamils emigrated; Hindu temples, built by the Sri Lankan Tamil diaspora, maintain their religion, tradition and culture.

Most Sri Lankan Hindus follow the Shaiva Siddhanta school of Shaivism, and some follow Shaktism. Sri Lanka is home to the five abodes of Shiva: Pancha Ishwarams, holy places believed to have been built by King Ravana. Murugan is one of the country's most popular Hindu deities, venerated by Hindu Tamils. The Buddhist Sinhalese and Aboriginal Veddas venerate the local rendition of the deity, Katharagama deviyo.

Yogaswami of Jaffna is a significant modern Hindu religious figure in Sri Lankan history. A 20th-century mystic, he was the Satguru and counselling sage of the country's Tamil Hindu population. The Ramakrishna Mission is active in the Amparai and Batticaloa districts, and the Shaiva Siddhanta school is prevalent in the north. Yogaswami was the 161st head of the Nandinatha Sampradaya, and was succeeded by Sivaya Subramuniyaswami.

Legendary origins
The first major Hindu reference to Sri Lanka is found in the epic Ramayana. Sri Lanka was ruled by the Yaksha King Kubera. The throne of Lanka was usurped by Kubera's half-brother Ravana, the epic's chief antagonist, who was killed by Rama (the seventh avatar of Vishnu). The Ramayana also mentions Rama's Bridge, between India and Sri Lanka, which was built with rocks by Rama with the aid of Hanuman and others. Many believers see the chain of sandbar, connecting Sri Lanka to India in satellite images, as remnants of the bridge. Archaeological evidence supports the worship of Siva in parts of Sri Lanka since prehistoric times, before the arrival of Prince Vijaya. Ravana was also a devotee of Siva.

Historic roots
The Nagas are claimed to have practised an early form of Hinduism, worshipping Shiva and serpents. This animistic Shaivism is also common in Tamil Nadu and other parts of India. The Nagas who inhabited the Jaffna Peninsula were probably the ancestors of Sri Lankan Tamils. They may have begun absorbing the Tamil language and culture during the 3rd century BC, and lost their separate identity. The Nainativu Nagapooshani Amman Temple in Nainativu is believed to be one of the Shakti Peetha.

Buddhism was introduced by Mahinda, the eldest son of Ashoka, during the reign of Devanampiya Tissa of Anuradhapura. His father Mutasiva and brother Mahasiva had names associated with Siva suggesting prior Hindu beliefs. This is supported by the common occurrence of the personal name Siva in the earliest Prakrit inscriptions. The Sinhalese embraced Buddhism, and the Tamils remained Hindus. Activity from across the Palk Strait in Tamil Nadu set the stage for Hinduism's survival in Sri Lanka. Shaivism (worship of Shiva) was dominant among the Tamils, and most of Sri Lanka's Hindu temple architecture and philosophy of Sri Lanka drew from that tradition. Thirugnana Sambanthar noted a number of Sri Lankan Hindu temples in his works.

Culture

Rituals
In common with South India, local rituals include Kavadi Attam and firewalking. These rituals have also influenced the Sinhalese on southern cost of the island; For an Instance, the inhabitants of Tangalle, Kudawella and the surrounding area perform Kavadi.

Religious teachers
Religious teachers include Kaddai Swami, his shishya Chellappaswami, and Chellappaswami's shishya Yogaswami. Swami Vivekananda the Bengali Hindu monk right after returning from West, started a series of lectures in India( British India at that time included Sri Lanka), from Colombo and Jaffna. The Hindus of Colombo and Jaffna received with much excitement and shouts of "Har Har Mahadev" and "Jai Swami Vivekanandaji" .

Temples

Most of the Hindu temple in Sri Lanka have Tamil architecture, most of which are ancient with Gopuram and Ratha in them. Alike many Hindu temples, which are dedicated to Hindu deities, many temples in Sri Lanka are also for their Village deities which is mainly among the Tamil community.

The Pancha Ishwarams are:
 Naguleswaram temple in the North.
 Ketheeswaram temple in the Northwest.
 Koneswaram Temple in the East.
 Munneswaram temple in the West.
 Tondeswaram in the South.
<

Demographics 
According to the 1981 census, there were 2,297,800 Hindus in Sri Lanka; the 2012 census reported 2,554,606 Hindus in the country. Twenty thousand people died during the 2004 tsunami in LTTE-held areas alone.

Decadal population 

The Hindu percentage have declined from 21.51% in 1881 to 12.58% in 2012. Mainly because of the indentured labourers brought by the British returning to India and immigration of Tamil Hindus caused by the Srilankan Civil War between 23 Jul 1983 – 18 May 2009. Around 1.5 lakh were killed and 1 million Tamils left Sri Lanka during that turmoil period.

District-wise population

See also 

 Hinduism in Guyana
 Hinduism in Brunei
 Hinduism in Réunion
 Tamil diaspora
 Sri Lankan Tamils
 Sri Lankan Civil War
 Village deities of Sri Lankan Tamils
 Village deities of South India
 Siva Senai

Notes

References

Citation

Sources

External links

 

 
Sri Lanka
Sri Lankan Tamil culture
Religion in Sri Lanka
Sri Lankan Hindus